This is a list of episodes for the Food Network cooking competition series Holiday Baking Championship. The series has been presented by Bobby Deen (seasons 1–3) and Jesse Palmer (seasons 4+) and judged by Nancy Fuller, Duff Goldman, Lorraine Pascale (seasons 1-6), and Carla Hall (seasons 7-9).

Series overview

Season 1
There were 8 professional and home bakers competing in a 6-episode baking tournament. One person was eliminated every week until the final episode where the final three compete in a single, all-day round for the grand prize of $50,000.

Contestants

 1st – Erin Campbell, Baker and Manager from Palmdale, California
 2nd/3rd – Bill Lipscomb, Culinary Instructor from Atlanta, Georgia
 2nd/3rd – Naylet Larochelle, Home Baker & Psychologist from Miami, Florida
 4th – Terra Nelson, Culinary Instructor from Louisville, Kentucky
 5th – David Bondarchuck, Caterer from Denver, Colorado
 6th – Dante Marasco, U.S. Navy Cook from Annapolis, Maryland
 7th – Punky Egan, Certified Master Baker from Madison, Wisconsin
 8th – Stephanie Hart, Bakery Owner from Chicago, Illinois

Episodes

Elimination Table

 (WINNER) This baker won the competition.
 (RUNNER-UP) This baker was a finalist.
 (ELIM) This baker was eliminated.
 (IN) This baker never had the best dish or the worst.
 (HIGH) This baker had one of the best dish.
 (WIN) This baker had the best dish in the main challenge.
‡ This baker had the best dish in the pre-heat challenge.
 (LOW) This baker was last to be called safe.

Season 2
There were 10 contestants competing in an 8-episode baking tournament. In this season there's mid-round twists in several of the second rounds (in the form of an extra ingredient the contestants had to add to their confection). One person was eliminated every week until the final episode where the final three compete for the grand prize of $50,000.

Contestants

 1st – Maeve Schulz, Bakery Owner from San Diego, California
 2nd/3rd – Adalberto Diaz, Pastry Chef & Instructor from Salt Lake City, Utah
 2nd/3rd – Steve Konopelski, Chef and Inn Co-Owner from Denton, Maryland
 4th – Haley Miller, Bakery Owner from Beaver Dam, Kentucky
 5th – Melody Larsen, Head Pastry Chef from Mesa, Arizona
 6th – Padua Player, Executive Pastry Chef from Washington, D.C.
 7th – Briana Johnson, Social Worker & Home Cook from Dallas, Texas
 8th – Susan Steffan, Bed & Breakfast Owner from Galena, Illinois
 9th – John Marasco , Firefighter in Thousand Oaks, California
 10th – Joe Settepani, Pastry Sous Chef from Staten Island, New York

: John Marasco's brother, Dante, competed in season 1 but was eliminated in the third episode.

Episodes

Elimination Table

 (WINNER) This baker won the competition.
 (RUNNER-UP) This baker was a finalist.
 (WIN) This baker had the best dish in the main challenge.
‡ This baker had the best dish in the pre-heat challenge.
 (HIGH) This baker had one of the best dishes.
 (LOW) This baker was last to be called safe.
 (ELIM) This baker was eliminated.

Season 3
There were 9 contestants competing in a 7-episode baking tournament. One person was eliminated every week until the final episode where the final three compete for the grand prize of $50,000. At the end of this season, there was a Holiday Baking Championship special episode where the three past season winners competed against three child bakers from the Kids Baking Championship.

Contestants

 1st – Jason Smith, Cafeteria Manager from Grayson, Kentucky
 2nd/3rd – Cheryl Storms, Bakery Owner from Oakland, California
 2nd/3rd – Shawne Bryan, Executive Pastry Chef from Miami, Florida
 4th – Matt Marotto, Executive Pastry Chef from Guttenberg, New Jersey
 5th – Amber Croom, Pastry Chef from Vail, Colorado
 6th – Vincenzo Vaccaro, Bakery Owner from Queens, New York
 7th – Patti Curfman, Bakery Owner from Stayton, Oregon
 8th – Maddie Carlos, Bakery Owner from Anoka, Minnesota
 9th – Keli Fayard, Executive Pastry Chef from Charlotte, North Carolina

Episodes

: Episode 8 was a special episode. Kids Baking Championship "fan favorite" contestants (Jackson Fujimori from season 1 and Matthew Merrill and Jane Haviland from season 2) vs. the three Holiday Baking Championship winners (season 1 winner Erin Campbell, season 2 winner Maeve Schulz-Rochford, and this season's winner Jason Smith). They competed for a chance at $10,000.

Elimination Table

 (WINNER) This baker won the competition.
 (RUNNER-UP) This baker was a finalist.
 (WIN) This baker had the best dish in the main challenge.
‡ This baker had the best dish in the pre-heat challenge.
 (HIGH) This baker had one of the best dishes.
 (LOW) This baker was last to be called safe.
 (ELIM) This baker was eliminated.

: Jason Smith was the first home cook to win Holiday Baking Championship. He later went on to win season 13 of Food Network Star.

Season 4
As with the previous season, 9 contestants competed in a 7-episode baking tournament. One person was eliminated every week until the final episode where the final three compete for the $50,000 grand prize. There was an additional special episode that aired on Christmas Day bringing up runner-up contestants from previous seasons for a one-episode showdown.

Contestants

 1st – Jennifer Barney, Bakery Owner from La Crosse, Wisconsin
 2nd/3rd – Stephany Buswell, Pastry Arts Instructor from Santa Cruz, California
 2nd/3rd – Joshua Livsey, Executive Pastry Chef from Boston, Massachusetts
 4th – Ian Barthley, Culinary Arts Teacher from Upper Marlboro, Maryland
 5th – Amy Strickland, Stay-at-home mom from Lake City, Florida
 6th – Andra Chisholm, Head Baker, Daytona State College, from Daytona Beach, Florida
 7th – Aristo Camburako, Executive Chef from Kansas City, Missouri
 8th – Pablo Sanchez, Executive Pastry Chef from Atlanta, Georgia
 9th – Aveed Dai, Home Baker from Chicago, Illinois

: Amy Strickland also appeared in season 2 of Halloween Baking Championship; she was forced to withdraw from that competition due to stress concerns since she was 6 months pregnant.

Episodes

: Episode 8 was a special episode. Six runner-up competitors from previous season finales returned to battle it out for a chance to win $10,000 (They were paired up into teams of two representing their respective seasons: Bill Lipscomb and Naylet Larochelle from season 1, Steve Konopelski and Adalberto Diaz from season 2, and Cheryl Storms and Shawne Bryan from season 3).

Elimination Table

 (WINNER) This baker won the competition.
 (RUNNER-UP) This baker was a finalist.
 (WIN) This baker had the best dish in the main challenge.
‡ This baker had the best dish in the pre-heat challenge.
 (HIGH) This baker had one of the best dishes.
 (LOW) This baker was last to be called safe.
 (ELIM) This baker was eliminated.

Season 5 
As with the previous season, 9 contestants competed in a 7-episode baking tournament where one contestant was sent home every week until the final three remain. However unlike previous seasons, the prize money has been halved this year; the winner gets $25,000 as well as a spot in Food Network Magazine and their own video on foodnetwork.com.

Contestants 

 1st – Douglas Phillips, Baking and Pastry Instructor from Ayer, Massachusetts
 2nd/3rd – Lerome Campbell, Pastry Chef from Naples, Florida
 2nd/3rd – Sarah Lucia Tafur, Bakery Owner from Miami, Florida
 4th – Chantal Thomas, Bakery Owner from Windsor, Connecticut
 5th – Dan Raymond, Pastry Shop Owner from Castleton, New York
 6th – Julia Perugini, Self-taught Baker from Maricopa, Arizona
 7th – Sherry Clarke, Home Baker from East Lyme, Connecticut
 8th – Nolan Schooley, Pastry Chef from Sanford, Michigan
 9th – Jamie Decena, Executive Pastry Chef from Chula Vista, California

: Julia Perugini was previously featured as a competitor on Christmas Cookie Challenge.

Episodes 

: In Episode 8, six past baking champions (from the various baking spin-offs) return in a "best of the best" competition. The judges (Nancy, Duff, and Lorraine) also served as hosts. The contestants were: Maeve Rochford from season 2, Jason Smith from season 3, and Jen Barney from season 4 of Holiday Baking Championship, Jordan Pilarski from season 3 and Nacho Aguirre from season 4 of Spring Baking Championship, and Michelle Antonishek from season 2 of Halloween Baking Championship.

Elimination Table 

 (WINNER) This baker won the competition.
 (RUNNER-UP) This baker was a finalist.
 (WIN) This baker had the best dish in the main challenge.
‡ This baker had the best dish in the pre-heat challenge.
 (HIGH) This baker had one of the best dishes.
 (LOW) This baker was last to be called safe.
 (ELIM) This baker was eliminated.

: In episode 2, there was a teams event causing two people to win the advantage.

Season 6

Contestants 

 1st – Melissa Yanc, Bakery Owner from Healdsburg, California
 2nd - Jennifer Clifford, Pastry Chef from Moultonborough, New Hampshire
 3rd - Sarah Wallace, Bakery General Manager from Boston, Massachusetts
 4th – Geoffrey Blount, Baking and Pastry Arts Instructor from Myrtle Beach, South Carolina
 5th – Dwight Penney, Executive Pastry Chef from Pittsburgh, Pennsylvania
 6th – Janet Letendre, Home Bakery Owner from Malakwa, British Columbia
 7th – Cedrick Simpson, Pastry Chef from Atlanta, Georgia
 8th – Kobe Doan, Home Baker from Boston, Massachusetts
 9th – Maria Short, Bakery Owner from Hilo, Hawaii
 10th – Devon Maciver, Home Baker from Claremont, California

Episodes Draft

Elimination Table 

 (WINNER) This baker won the competition.
 (RUNNER-UP) This baker was a finalist.
 (WIN) This baker had the best dish in the main challenge.
‡ This baker had the best dish in the pre-heat challenge.
 (HIGH) This baker had one of the best dishes.
 (LOW) This baker was last to be called safe.
 (ELIM) This baker was eliminated.

Season 7
12 bakers enter the kitchen to compete for the $25,000 prize, a chance to be featured on the Food Network Kitchen app, and the title of Holiday Baking Champion. New this year, the bakers will be ranked on the "Naughty or Nice" list after each challenge. The lowest ranked baker after each main heat will be eliminated from the competition. However, in the first episode of the season, the lowest ranked baker after the first pre-heat was eliminated.

Contestants 

 1st - Julianna Jung, Home Baker from Champaign, Illinois
 2nd/3rd - Lorenzo Delgado, Pastry Chef from Miami, Florida
 2nd/3rd - Megan Rountree, Bakery Owner from Keller, Texas
 4th - Eva Roberts, Bakery Owner from Spokane, Washington
 5th - Lashonda Sanford, Bakery Owner from Newport News, Virginia
 6th - Jon Buatti, Bakery Owner from Auburn, New Hampshire
 7th - Jamaal Nettles, Pastry Chef from Atlanta, Georgia
 8th - Kess Eshun, Pastry Chef and Bakery Owner from Frisco, Texas
 9th - Jeffrey Gray, Home Baker from Atlanta, Georgia
 10th - Aubrey Shaffner, Pastry Chef from Baltimore, Maryland
 11th - Kristina Stephenson, Pastry Chef from Spokane, Washington
 12th - Jonathan Peregrino, Pastry Chef from Detroit, Michigan

Episodes 

: On December 20, prior to episode 8, there was a special hour-long episode titled Sweet Secrets. This was hosted by judges Duff Goldman, Nancy Fuller, and Carla Hall. They offered a behind-the-scenes look at the set where Holiday Baking Championship is filmed and discussed topics relating to this season such as: their favorite and least favorite desserts up to this point, the road to the finale with the finalists and their strengths/weaknesses, their relationships with each other on and off set, how they went about the whole elimination process of picking the least successful baker, and also showed a small sneak peek of the finale at the end.

Elimination Table 

 (WINNER) This baker won the competition.
 (RUNNER-UP) This baker was a finalist.
 (WIN) This baker had the best dish in the challenge.
 (IN) This baker did well enough to continue in the competition. Also included in the baker's rank in that round on the "Naughty or Nice list."
‡ This baker had the best dish in the pre-heat challenge and had an advantage in the main heat. 
 (SAFE) This baker did not need to complete in this round and was into the next round.
 (HIGH) This baker had one of the best dishes.
 (LOW) This baker was last to be called safe.
 (ELIM) This baker was eliminated.

: In season 7, there were some small deviations from the elimination pattern of previous seasons: in the first episode, there was an elimination in both the preheat and the main heat; and in the finale, there were four bakers instead of three and three rounds instead of two, with all four bakers completing in the preheat, after which the two lowest performing bakers in the preheat went head-to-head in an elimination challenge, and finally the remaining three bakers competed in the final round. Additionally bakers were ranked in every round, both preheat and main heat, of every episode on the "Naughty or Nice List"

Season 8
12 bakers enter the kitchen to compete for the $25,000 prize, a chance to be featured in Food Network magazine, and the title of Holiday Baking Champion. Duff Goldman, Nancy Fuller, and Carla Hall return to judge with Jesse Palmer hosting.

New this year: in the first 5 weeks, if any baker won both the Preheat and Main Heat in the same week, they would be immune from elimination the following week and Jesse Palmer sometimes gave the bakers non-spoken indicators of when time starts, such as when a christmas tree on set lit up in episode 1 or he chopped a log in episode 2. The lowest ranked baker after each main heat will be eliminated from the competition. However, at the end of the first episode, there was a double elimination with two bakers being sent home.

Contestants 

 1st- Adam Monette, Culinary Arts Instructor from Saint Albans, VT
2/3rd - Sabrina Coombs, Executive Pastry Chef from Atlanta, GA
 2/3rd- Jody O'Sullivan, Pastry Chef/Instructor from Boston, MA
 4th- Jose Marchan, Pastry Chef from Cleveland, OH
 5th - Richard Akers-Barrows, Pastry Cook from Dorchester, MA
 6th - Marilyn Santos McNabb, Pastry Chef from Chicago, IL
 7th - Neomie Eliezer, Head Pastry Chef from Cherry Hill, NJ
 8th - Philippe Costa, Home Baker from Seaside, CA
 9th - Jennifer Hood, Dietitian/Home Baker from Winston-Salem, NC
 10th - Naomi Mwangi, Home Bakery Owner from McKinney, TX
 11th - Shayla Daniels, Pastry Chef from Odessa, FL
 12th - Grace Lapsys, Pastry Chef from Albuquerque, NM

: In episode 1, it was revealed Naomi was approved to be on season 7, but due to a conflict schedule with becoming a naturalized citizen at the same time as when this show was filmed the previous year, she took care of that over being on the show then and was allowed to be on the show this year.

Episodes 

: Jody and Adam made the best cornucopia, so they were both safe from elimination this week, which was announced before Jody was announced in the top two.

: Jody won immunity from elimination for week 5, by winning the Preheat and the Main Heat on week 4, making him the first baker to win immunity on Holiday Baking Championship.

: Adam won immunity from elimination for week 6, by winning the Preheat and the Main Heat on week 5, making him the second baker to win immunity on Holiday Baking Championship.

Elimination Table 

 (WINNER) This baker won the competition.
 (RUNNER-UP) This baker was a finalist.
 (ELIM) This baker was eliminated.
 (IN) This baker never had the best dish or the worst.
 (HIGH) This baker had one of the best dish.
 (WIN) This baker had the best dish in the main challenge.
‡ This baker had the best dish in the pre-heat challenge.
 (LOW) This baker was last to be called safe.

Season 9

Contestants 

1st- Dru Tevis, Corporate Pastry Chef from Rehoboth Beach, DE
 2nd- Aishia Martinez, Pastry Cook from Hoboken, New Jersey
 3rd/4th-Aaron Davis, Cake Decorator from Surprise, AZ
3rd/4th- Jessica Wang,  Pastry food stylist from Los Angeles, CA
5th- Bill Makin , Home Baker from Brooklyn, NY
6th- Zakiya Newton, Pastry Chef and Home bakery Owner from Gotha, FL
7th-Harshal Naik , Pastry Chef from Bedford, PA
8th-Kristen Weidlien, Executive Pastry Chef from Staten Island, NY
9th- Christine Herelle-Lewis , French Pastry Chef from New York, NY
10th- Sumera Syed, Home Baker Entrepreneur  from Dallas, TX
 11th- Antoine Hopkins, Pastry Chef from Philadelphia, PA
 12th -RaChelle Hubsmith, Home Baker from Salt Lake City, UT

Episodes

Elimination Table

 (WINNER) This baker won the competition.
 (RUNNER-UP) This baker was a finalist.
 (ELIM) This baker was eliminated.
 (IN) This baker did not have the best dish or the worst dish.
 (HIGH) This baker had one of the best dishes.
 (WIN) This baker had the best dish in the main challenge.
‡ This baker had the best dish in the pre-heat challenge.
 (LOW) This baker was last to be called safe.

Specials

Christmas in July (2019)
Four bakers and self-professed holiday fanatics, competed in a special summer episode of Holiday Baking Championship where the winner got $10,000. The host was Jesse Palmer and the judges were the same as always: Nancy Fuller, Duff Goldman, and Lorraine Pascale.

Contestants

 1st – Alessandro Caria, Home Baker from Windermere, Florida
 2nd/3rd/4th – TyNesha Hills, Pastry Chef from Philadelphia, Pennsylvania
 2nd/3rd/4th – Jonathan Ramirez, Bakery Owner from Fredericton, Canada
 2nd/3rd/4th – Jennifer Jacobs, Bakery Owner from Clearwater, Florida

References

Lists of American non-fiction television series episodes
Lists of reality television series episodes